The 1994 FIFA World Cup qualification was a series of tournaments organised by the six FIFA confederations. The 1994 FIFA World Cup featured 24 teams with one place reserved for the host nation, United States, and one place for the defending champions, Germany. The remaining 22 places were determined by a qualification process, in which 147 teams, from the six FIFA confederations, competed. Most of the successful teams were determined within these confederations, with a limited number of inter-confederation play-offs occurring at the end of the process.

Fifteen teams withdrew: Liechtenstein, Cuba, Gambia, Burkina Faso, Liberia, Malawi, Mali, Mauritania, São Tomé and Príncipe, Sierra Leone, Sudan, Tanzania, Uganda, Myanmar and Western Samoa, and three teams were excluded: Yugoslavia and Libya due to UN sanctions, and Chile for the El Maracanazo cheating incident during 1990 qualification. 

A total of 130 teams played at least one qualifying match. A total of 497 qualifying matches were played, and 1446 goals were scored (an average of 2.91 per match).

The first qualification match, between Dominican Republic and Puerto Rico, was played on 21 March 1992, and the Puerto Rican forward Marcos Lugris scored the first goal in qualification. Qualification ended on 17 November 1993, when European qualification ended and the OFC–CONMEBOL play-off match was played. Eighteen of FIFA's twenty-four top-ranked countries eventually qualified.

Qualified teams

Qualification process 

The draw was made in New York on 8 December 1991 at Madison Square Garden.

For the first time, three teams qualified from the African zone, because of its performance in the previous tournament. The 24 spots available in the 1994 World Cup were distributed among the continental zones as follows:
 Europe (UEFA): 13 places. 1 of them went to automatic qualifier Germany, while the other 12 places were contested by 38 teams (including Israel).
 South America (CONMEBOL): 3.5 places, contested by 9 teams.
 North, Central America and Caribbean (CONCACAF): 2.25 places, 1 of them went to automatic qualifier United States, while the other 1.25 places were contested by 22 teams.
 Africa (CAF): 3 places, contested by 40 teams.
 Asia (AFC): 2 places, contested by 29 teams.
 Oceania (OFC): 0.25 places, contested by 7 teams.
UEFA, AFC and CAF have a guaranteed number of places, whereas the number of qualifiers from other confederations is dependent on play-offs between OFC's first-placed team and CONCACAF's second-placed team and the winner of this fixture against CONMEBOL's fourth-placed team.

After the first round of 1994 FIFA World Cup finals, the percentage of teams from each confederation that passed through to the round of 16 was as follows:
 AFC (Asia): 50% (1 of 2 places)
 CAF (Africa): 33% (1 of 3 places)
 CONCACAF (North, Central American and Caribbean): 100% (2 of 2 places)
 CONMEBOL (South America): 50% (2 of 4 places)
 OFC (Oceania): n/a (0 of 0 places)
 UEFA (Europe): 77% (10 of 13 places)

Summary of qualification

Tiebreakers 
For FIFA World Cup qualifying stages using a league format, the method used for separating teams level on points is the same for all Confederations. If teams are even on points at the end of group play, the tied teams will be ranked by:
 goal difference in all group matches
 greater number of goals scored in all group matches
For FIFA World Cup qualifying stages using a home-and-away knockout format, the team that has the higher aggregate score over the two legs progresses to the next round. In the event that aggregate scores finish level, the away goals rule is applied, i.e. the team that scored more goals away from home over the two legs progresses. If away goals are also equal, then thirty minutes of extra time are played, divided into two fifteen-minutes halves. The away goals rule is again applied after extra time, i.e. if there are goals scored during extra time and the aggregate score is still level, the visiting team qualifies by virtue of more away goals scored. If no goals are scored during extra time, the tie is decided by penalty shoot-out.

Confederation qualification

AFC 
Qualification for AFC teams consisted of two rounds. Round one saw the teams divided into 6 groups, each team playing the others in their group twice. The winner of each group then went into a final group where they played each other once.

The qualification process began with 29 national teams vying for two spots. Saudi Arabia and Korea Republic qualified.

Final positions (final round)

CAF 
Qualification for CAF teams also consisted of two rounds. Round one saw the teams divided into 9 groups, each team playing the others in their group twice. The winners of these groups then went into three final groups where they played each other twice.

The qualification process began with 40 national teams vying for three spots. Nigeria, Morocco and Cameroon qualified.

Final positions (final round)

CONCACAF 
There were three rounds of play for CONCACAF teams. Mexico and Canada received byes and advanced to the second round directly. The remaining teams were divided into Caribbean and Central American zones. In the Caribbean zone, 14 teams played in knockout matches on a home-and-away basis to determine three winners advancing to the second round. In the Central American zone, the six teams were paired up to play knockout matches on a home-and-away basis. The winners advanced to the second round.

In the second round, the eight teams were divided into two groups of four teams each. They played against each other on a home-and-away basis. The group winners and runners-up advanced to the final round.

In the final round, the four teams played against each other on a home-and-away basis. The group winner qualified. The runner-up advanced to the CONCACAF–OFC intercontinental play-off. Mexico took the guaranteed spot and Canada qualified for the play-off.

Final positions (final round)

CONMEBOL 
Nine CONMEBOL teams entered the competition (Chile was banned by FIFA due to the 1989 Maracanazo incident). The nine teams were divided into two groups. The teams played against each other on a home-and-away basis. Group A had one guaranteed place and one play-off spot, while Group B had two spots for the finals. Colombia, Brazil and Bolivia qualified automatically and Argentina qualified for the play-off.

Final positions (group stage)

OFC 
Qualification for OFC teams consisted of two rounds. Seven teams entered initially and were divided into two groups, but Western Samoa withdrew. The two group winners then played against each other on a home-and-away basis. The winner advanced to the CONCACAF–OFC intercontinental play-off. Australia won the tie and advanced.

Second round 

|}

UEFA 

38 were initially involved in UEFA qualifying, but Liechtenstein withdrew and Yugoslavia was suspended.

The thirty-six teams were divided into six groups: one group of five teams, four groups of six teams each, and one group of seven teams. The teams played against each other on a home-and-away basis. The group winners and runners-up qualified.

Italy, Switzerland, Norway, Netherlands, Spain, Ireland, Romania, Belgium, Greece, Russia, Sweden, and Bulgaria all qualified.

Final positions (group stage)

Inter-confederation play-offs 

For the first time ever, there were two rounds of play in the inter-confederation play-offs. The teams from CONCACAF and OFC first played each other on a home-and-away basis. The winner then played against the team from CONMEBOL on a home-and-away basis. The winner qualified.

First round: CONCACAF v OFC

Second round: OFC v CONMEBOL

Top goalscorers

13 goals
 Kazuyoshi Miura

9 goals
 Florin Răducioiu

8 goals
 Alaa Kadhim
 Rashidi Yekini
 Ha Seok-Ju
 Piyapong Pue-On
 Ian Rush

References

External links
 1994 FIFA World Cup USA Preliminaries
 RSSSF - 1994 World Cup Qualification

 
Qualification
FIFA World Cup qualification